"Gotta Get Away" is a song written by Janis Oliver, and recorded by American country music duo Sweethearts of the Rodeo.  It was released in September  1987 as the fifth single from the album Sweethearts of the Rodeo.  The song reached #10 on the Billboard Hot Country Singles & Tracks chart.

Chart performance

References

1987 singles
1986 songs
Sweethearts of the Rodeo songs
Song recordings produced by Steve Buckingham (record producer)
Columbia Records singles